Chief Jerome Oputa Udoji CMG, CFR (1912–2010), Igwe Ozuluoha I of Igboland, was a Nigerian business administrator, government official, traditional ruler, and philanthropist. He was one of Nigeria's most famous public servants as a result of the "Udoji Award" and his various roles in the government and private sector. Udoji commanded respect both nationally and internationally as an honest, disciplined and intellectually alert public administrator and private sector operator. He received his education at the University of Cambridge in England and later the Economic Institute of the World Bank in Washington. He held the traditional title of Igwe, was a recipient of the Commander of the most distinguished Order of Saint Michael and Saint George by the British Crown in 1959, Commander of Order of the Federal Republic of Nigeria (CFR) in 1963, and became a Papal knight of the Order of Saint Gregory the Great in 1975.

Over the course of his government career he served in the ministries of finance, health and commerce, and was head of service in the former Eastern Region, Nigeria. He was part of the Constituent Assembly of 1977-78 that worked on the 1979 Constitution of Nigeria (Second Republic) and served as the official Constitutional Adviser, to the Eastern Nigerian delegation to the Nigerian Constitutional Conference in London.

Udoji was also the first Nigerian to serve as Chairman of a multinational corporation in Nigeria and his success in that position opened the way to other Nigerians: Christopher Abebe in UAC, Michael Omolayole in Lever Brothers, Gamaliel Onosode in Cadbury and Jamodu in PZ. He helped found the Nigerian Stock Exchange (NSE) and served as its first Chairman from 1981 to 1986 in conjunction with his service as the second Chairman of the Manufacturers Association of Nigeria (MAN) from 1982 to 1987. Between 1974 and 1993, he was either the chairman or on the board of at least 13 major corporations, including Citibank Nigeria, The Nigerian Tobacco Company, R.T. Briscoe, Michellin, Motor Tyre Service Company, Wiggins Teape, Udoji United F.C., and Solgas Petroleum.
 
He played a pivotal role in the shaping of the post-civil war history of Nigeria. A celebrated administrator, teacher, lawyer and businessman, Udoji, also positively impacted other countries of the African continent, during his eventful life as a United Nations consultant. For his contributions he received numerous honors and traditional titles including having schools, roads, and a government building named in his honor. In 1995 he published his memoirs, titled "Under Three Masters" and some of his speeches and correspondences as, Which Way Nigeria?: Selected Speeches of Chief J.O. Udoji (2000, Ibadan, Spectrum). Upon His passing, Governor Peter Obi of Anambra State stated "Udoji was a legend, a selfless Nigerian and a devout Christian who took care of the down-trodden, the widows and the poor. His death will create a lacuna that will be very difficult to fill."

Early life and education 
Udoji was born in 1912 to the Ezemba-Dogbu Udoji family in Ozubulu, Ekusigo LGA of Anambra State. He held the title of Igwe in Ozubulu. A man of great learning and vast experience, Udoji started formal education at St. Michael's Catholic School, Ozubulu (1920–26), went to St. Charles Training College, Onitsha (1929–31), before heading to Kings College, Cambridge University, England (1945–48), and being called to the Bar, Gray's Inn, London, in 1948. He was also at the World Bank, Washington, between 1955 and 1956. Udoji received a graduate and post graduate degree from Cambridge University. 
Prior to attending King's College in Cambridge, he worked as a teacher in schools in the Eastern and Western regions, including Ibadan Grammar School and Abeokuta Grammar School. He also served the secretary in charge of the Western Nigerian provinces.

Public service 
On his return from England, Udoji joined the Colonial Administrative Service and was made an assistant district officer in Ado Ekiti before being posted as district officer for Egbado. As colonial administrative officer he had a distinguished service in Ondo and Abeokuta provinces of the country. In 1954, he was transferred to the Eastern region and made the permanent secretary in the ministries of Health, Commerce, Finance and Establishments. In 1959, Udoji's exemplary dedication to duty, his remarkable intellectual capacity and his integrity made him rise up to the level of Head of the Region’s civil service, Chief Secretary to the Premier of the Eastern Region, Dr Michael Okpara, as well as Secretary to the Executive Council. He remained in that position until the 1966 Nigerian coup d'état. Following the coup he went into private legal practice (1966–68) and served as a Ford Foundation Consultant in Administration and Management (1968–72).

In 1972, during Nigeria's oil boom period, he was assigned by the Yakubu Gowon administration to head a review commission of the civil service standards and compensation in the country. The commission made recommendations such as an increase in the salaries of public servants, civil servants training, a unified and integrated administrative structure, elimination of waste and removal of inefficient departments and introduction of an efficient civil service on the basis of management by objective. The commission also recommended the establishment of an Ombudsman in the country. The commission's report was portrayed in subsequent years as a salary review commission though the original intent was to study and make sweeping recommendations on the public service including the recommendation of an objective or goal oriented management style. This salary increases are known today as the "Udoji Award".

International service 
Widely traveled, Udoji served as the Chairman of the Africanisation Commission of the East African Community, covering Kenya, Uganda and Tanzania (1963). He also served as a consultant to the United Nations Conference on the Management of Public Enterprises held in Yugoslavia (1969), and served in Swaziland (1970) as sole Commissioner for the country's Localization Commission, functioned as Secretary-General of the African Association for Public Administration and Management (1972–75) and was appointed by the United Nations Development Programme (UNDP) to review and re-organise Uganda's Public Service in 1991. He was part of the Constituent Assembly of 1977-78 that worked on the 1979 Constitution of Nigeria and was also President of the Nigerian Stock Exchange (NSE) from 1981 to 1986 and President of the Manufacturers Association of Nigeria (MAN) from 1982 to 1987.

Business career and family 
In the Nigerian first republic, Udoji represented the regional governments in some of the latter's financial concerns such as Hotel Presidential, Enugu and Port Harcourt and Independence Breweries, Umuahia. However, following disagreements between him and the new military authorities in 1966, he left the regional civil service to practice law briefly before joining Ford foundation. Udoji served on numerous boards as Chairman including the board of directors of R.T. Briscoe, Motor Tyre Service Company, Wiggins Teape, and the Nigerian Tobacco Company.

The autobiography "Under Three Masters: Memoirs of an African Administrator" states that Chief Jerome Udoji married Marcelina Uzoamaka Udoji née Onuchukwu, daughter of Pa William Onuchukwu, a renowned educationist in Onitsha. She died in October 1992. Jerome Udoji had three children - a daughter, Scholastica - and two sons - Osita Paul (aka Oscar) and Peter Ebelechukwu (aka Sunday) Udoji. Mrs. Scholastica Lola Onwubuya is a retired educationist, civil servant and guidance counsellor.

Chief Osita Oscar Paul Udoji is the founder and CEO of Superior Motors Ltd. and Executive Car Rentals Ltd. He was honoured by Newswatch Magazine in their "Emergent Titans" Category along with Tony Elumelu, Isyaku Rabiu, Folu Ayeni  and Leo Stan Ekeh for their accomplishments in business. Jerome Udoji also served as Chairman for two companies which Oscar Udoji was the Founder and CEO, namely, Solgas Petroleum and Udoji United F.C. Oscar Udoji also served as the national Chairman for the Congress for Progressive Change (CPC) political party who finished as runners up in the 2011 Presidential Elections with General Muhammadu Buhari as its presidential candidate.
Mr. Peter Ebelechukwu Udoji is the founder and CEO of BELSUN Holdings Ltd. - a going concern, and chairman of the Nigeria China Electrical Development Company Limited (Nigerchin).

Chief Jerome Udoji before his passing had 11 grandchildren.

Death 
Jerome Udoji died on 2 April 2010, the day of Good Friday, at the age of 98. His son Chief Oscar Udoji confirmed this in a statement. Governor Peter Obi of Anambra State described Udoji's death as a great loss to the nation.  "He was an exemplary man. He did the nation proud in every area of his life. The state government will be fully involved in the burial," he said.

Family friend Cardinal Francis Arinze said the Mass in the burial. In his sermon, Cardinal Arinze said the life and times of Udoji reflected how men who found themselves in authority should conduct themselves in public. Cardinal Arinze described Udoji as a man who used his experience, wealth and position to cater for many Nigerians by recommending a salary package for workers, while protecting the interest of the poor. "Udoji was a man of integrity, selfless, humane who lived a good life. Everyone present at his funeral today must have benefited from his Udoji Award," he said, urging all to emulate his legacies.

Also in his condolence message, Governor Peter Obi described Udoji as one of few Nigerians who projected the country’s image internationally and locally. According to Obi, the contributions set by Udoji improved the standard of lives of many Nigerians, especially civil servants, saying that their appreciation could be seen in the large turn out to pay their last respects. He said that Anambra State had immortalized him by naming the newly built secretariat after Udoji and urged the Federal Government to honor him as one of the few Nigerians that have contributed immensely to the nation’s development.

In remembrance Vanguard newspaper stated "Chief Udoji was a devout Christian, a Knight and a community leader who never compromised standards and integrity. He was a rare breed whose patriotism and commitment to service was non peril."

References 
Under Three Masters: Memoirs of an African Administrator by Jerome Oputa Udoji, 1995, Spectrum, Ibadan, Nigeria
Celebrating Jerome Udoji, the social reformer/https://web.archive.org/web/20081121205105/http://www.sunnewsonline.com/webpages/features/arts/2008/aug/26/arts-26-08-2008-002.htm
 Jerome, the Man Behind Udoji Award, is Dead/http://www.thisdayonline.com/nview.php?id=170782/ 
Jerome Udoji: An administrator par excellence /http://www.businessdayonline.com/index.php?option=com_content&view=article&id=10146:jerome-udoji-an-administrator-par-excellence&catid=98:editorial&Itemid=351
Biography of a Nonagenarian celebrating Chief jerome Udoji by Henryking Onyedikachukwu Adibe
Specific

1912 births
2010 deaths
20th-century Nigerian lawyers
Nigerian businesspeople
Nigerian philanthropists
Commanders of the Order of the Federal Republic
20th-century philanthropists